Odžak is a village in the municipality of Ilijaš, Bosnia and Herzegovina.

Demographics 
According to the 2013 census, its population was 307.

References

External link 
 GPS Coordinats of Odžak (Ilijaš)

Populated places in Ilijaš